This page lists all described species of the spider family Psilodercidae accepted by the World Spider Catalog :

A

Althepus

Althepus Thorell, 1898
 A. bako Deeleman-Reinhold, 1995 — Malaysia (Borneo)
 A. bamensis F. Y. Li & S. Q. Li, 2018 — Thailand
 A. biltoni Deeleman-Reinhold, 1995 — Indonesia (Sulawesi)
 A. changmao F. Y. Li & S. Q. Li, 2018 — Thailand
 A. chengmenensis F. Y. Li & S. Q. Li, 2018 — China
 A. cheni F. Y. Li & S. Q. Li, 2018 — Myanmar
 A. christae Wang & Li, 2013 — China
 A. complicatus Deeleman-Reinhold, 1995 — Indonesia (Sumatra)
 A. dekkingae Deeleman-Reinhold, 1995 — Indonesia (Java)
 A. devraii Kulkarni & Dupérré, 2019 — India
 A. dongnaiensis F. Y. Li & S. Q. Li, 2018 — Vietnam
 A. duan F. Y. Li & S. Q. Li, 2017 — Thailand
 A. duoji F. Y. Li & S. Q. Li, 2017 — Thailand
 A. erectus F. Y. Li, S. Q. Li & Jäger, 2014 — Laos
 A. flabellaris F. Y. Li, S. Q. Li & Jäger, 2014 — Thailand
 A. gouci F. Y. Li & S. Q. Li, 2018 — Myanmar
 A. guan F. Y. Li & S. Q. Li, 2018 — Indonesia (Sumatra)
 A. hongguangi F. Y. Li & S. Q. Li, 2018 — Indonesia (Sulawesi)
 A. huoyan F. Y. Li & S. Q. Li, 2017 — Thailand
 A. incognitus Brignoli, 1973 — India
 A. indistinctus Deeleman-Reinhold, 1995 — Indonesia (Borneo)
 A. javanensis Deeleman-Reinhold, 1995 — Indonesia (Java)
 A. jiandan F. Y. Li & S. Q. Li, 2017 — Thailand
 A. kuan F. Y. Li & S. Q. Li, 2017 — Thailand
 A. lakmueangensis F. Y. Li & S. Q. Li, 2017 — Thailand
 A. languensis F. Y. Li & S. Q. Li, 2017 — Thailand
 A. lehi Deeleman-Reinhold, 1985 — Malaysia (Borneo)
 A. leucosternus Deeleman-Reinhold, 1995 — Thailand
 A. maechamensis F. Y. Li & S. Q. Li, 2018 — Thailand
 A. menglaensis F. Y. Li & S. Q. Li, 2018 — China
 A. minimus Deeleman-Reinhold, 1995 — Indonesia (Sumatra)
 A. muangensis F. Y. Li & S. Q. Li, 2017 — Thailand
 A. naphongensis F. Y. Li & S. Q. Li, 2018 — Vietnam
 A. natmataungensis F. Y. Li & S. Q. Li, 2018 — Myanmar
 A. noonadanae Brignoli, 1973 — Philippines
 A. nophaseudi F. Y. Li, S. Q. Li & Jäger, 2014 — Laos
 A. phadaengensis F. Y. Li & S. Q. Li, 2018 — Thailand
 A. phousalao F. Y. Li & S. Q. Li, 2018 — Laos
 A. pictus Thorell, 1898 (type) — Myanmar
 A. pum Deeleman-Reinhold, 1995 — Thailand
 A. qianhuang F. Y. Li & S. Q. Li, 2018 — Indonesia (Java)
 A. qingyuani F. Y. Li & S. Q. Li, 2018 — China
 A. qiqiu F. Y. Li & S. Q. Li, 2017 — Thailand
 A. reduncus F. Y. Li, S. Q. Li & Jäger, 2014 — Myanmar
 A. sepakuensis F. Y. Li & S. Q. Li, 2018 — Indonesia (Borneo)
 A. shanhu F. Y. Li & S. Q. Li, 2018 — Myanmar
 A. spiralis F. Y. Li, S. Q. Li & Jäger, 2014 — Malaysia
 A. stonei Deeleman-Reinhold, 1995 — Thailand
 A. suayaiensis F. Y. Li & S. Q. Li, 2018 — Thailand
 A. suhartoi Deeleman-Reinhold, 1985 — Indonesia (Sumatra)
 A. tadetuensis F. Y. Li & S. Q. Li, 2018 — Laos
 A. tanhuang F. Y. Li & S. Q. Li, 2018 — Thailand
 A. thanlaensis F. Y. Li & S. Q. Li, 2018 — Thailand
 A. tharnlodensis F. Y. Li & S. Q. Li, 2018 — Thailand
 A. tibiatus Deeleman-Reinhold, 1985 — Thailand
 A. tuqi F. Y. Li & S. Q. Li, 2017 — Thailand
 A. viengkeoensis F. Y. Li & S. Q. Li, 2018 — Laos
 A. xianxi F. Y. Li & S. Q. Li, 2017 — Thailand
 A. xuae F. Y. Li & S. Q. Li, 2018 — China
 A. yizhuang F. Y. Li & S. Q. Li, 2018 — Indonesia (Sumatra)

F

Flexicrurum

Flexicrurum Tong & Li, 2007
 F. flexicrurum Tong & Li, 2007 (type) — China (Hainan)
 F. longispina Tong & Li, 2007 — China (Hainan)
 F. minutum Tong & Li, 2007 — China (Hainan)
 F. qishi F. Y. Li & S. Q. Li, 2019 — China (Hainan)
 F. wuzhishanense F. Y. Li & S. Q. Li, 2019 — China (Hainan)
 F. yangjiao F. Y. Li & S. Q. Li, 2019 — China (Hainan)

L

Leclercera

Leclercera Deeleman-Reinhold, 1995
 L. aniensis Chang & Li, 2020 — China
 L. banensis Chang & Li, 2020 — Thailand
 L. duandai Chang & Li, 2020 — China
 L. duibaensis Chang & Li, 2020 — China
 L. dumuzhou Chang & Li, 2020 — Thailand
 L. ekteenensis Chang & Li, 2020 — Nepal
 L. hponensis Chang & Li, 2020 — Myanmar
 L. jianzuiyu Chang & Li, 2020 — Thailand
 L. jiazhongensis Chang & Li, 2020 — China
 L. khaoyai Deeleman-Reinhold, 1995 (type) — Thailand
 L. lizi Chang & Li, 2020 — China
 L. longiventris Deeleman-Reinhold, 1995 — Thailand
 L. machadoi (Brignoli, 1973) — Nepal
 L. maochong Chang & Li, 2020 — China
 L. mianqiu Chang & Li, 2020 — Indonesia (Sulawesi)
 L. mulcata (Brignoli, 1973) — Nepal
 L. nagarjunensis F. Y. Li & S. Q. Li, 2018 — Nepal
 L. negros Deeleman-Reinhold, 1995 — Philippines
 L. niuqu F. Y. Li & S. Q. Li, 2018 — Nepal
 L. ocellata Deeleman-Reinhold, 1995 — Borneo
 L. paiensis Chang & Li, 2020 — China
 L. pulongensis Chang & Li, 2020 — China
 L. renqinensis Chang & Li, 2020 — China
 L. sanjiao Chang & Li, 2020 — China
 L. selasihensis Chang & Li, 2020 — Indonesia (Sumatra)
 L. shanzi Chang & Li, 2020 — China
 L. shergylaensis Chang & Li, 2020 — China
 L. sidai F. Y. Li & S. Q. Li, 2018 — Nepal
 L. spinata Deeleman-Reinhold, 1995 — Indonesia (Sulawesi)
 L. suwanensis Chang & Li, 2020 — Thailand
 L. thamkaewensis Chang & Li, 2020 — Thailand
 L. thamsangensis Chang & Li, 2020 — Thailand
 L. tudao Chang & Li, 2020 — China
 L. undulata Wang & Li, 2013 — China
 L. xiangbabang Chang & Li, 2020 — Thailand
 L. xiaodai Chang & Li, 2020 — China
 L. yamaensis Chang & Li, 2020 — Thailand
 L. yandou Chang & Li, 2020 — Malaysia (Peninsula)
 L. yanjing Chang & Li, 2020 — China
 L. yuanzhui Chang & Li, 2020 — China
 L. zanggaensis Chang & Li, 2020 — China
 L. zhamensis Chang & Li, 2020 — China
 L. zhaoi F. Y. Li & S. Q. Li, 2018 — Nepal

Luzonacera

Luzonacera F. Y. Li & S. Q. Li, 2017
 L. chang F. Y. Li & S. Q. Li, 2017 (type) — Philippines (Luzon)
 L. duan F. Y. Li & S. Q. Li, 2017 — Philippines (Luzon)
 L. francescoballarini F. Y. Li & S. Q. Li, 2019 — Philippines (Luzon)
 L. lattuensis F. Y. Li & S. Q. Li, 2019 — Philippines (Luzon)
 L. peterjaegeri F. Y. Li & S. Q. Li, 2019 — Philippines (Luzon)

M

Merizocera

Merizocera Fage, 1912
 M. baoshan Li, 2020 — China
 M. betong Li, 2020 — Thailand
 M. brincki Brignoli, 1975 — Sri Lanka
 M. colombo Li, 2020 — Sri Lanka
 M. crinita (Fage, 1929) — Malaysia
 M. cruciata (Simon, 1893) (type) — Sri Lanka
 M. galle Li, 2020 — Sri Lanka
 M. hponkanrazi Li, 2020 — Myanmar
 M. kachin Li, 2020 — Myanmar
 M. kandy Li, 2020 — Sri Lanka
 M. krabi Li, 2020 — Thailand
 M. kurunegala Li, 2020 — Sri Lanka
 M. lincang Li, 2020 — China
 M. mainling Li, 2020 — China
 M. mandai Li, 2020 — Singapore
 M. nyingchi Li, 2020 — China
 M. oryzae Brignoli, 1975 — Sri Lanka
 M. peraderiya Li, 2020 — Sri Lanka
 M. phuket Li, 2020 — Thailand
 M. picturata (Simon, 1893) — Sri Lanka
 M. putao Li, 2020 — Myanmar
 M. pygmaea Deeleman-Reinhold, 1995 — Thailand
 M. ranong Li, 2020 — Thailand
 M. ratnapura Li, 2020 — Sri Lanka
 M. salawa Li, 2020 — Sri Lanka
 M. stellata (Simon, 1905) — Indonesia (Java)
 M. tak Li, 2020 — Thailand
 M. tanintharyi Li, 2020 — Myanmar
 M. tengchong Li, 2020 — China
 M. thenna Li, 2020 — Sri Lanka
 M. uva Li, 2020 — Sri Lanka
 M. wenshan Li, 2020 — China
 M. wui Li, 2020 — Myanmar
 M. yala Li, 2020 — Thailand
 M. yuxi Li, 2020 — China

P

Priscaleclercera

Priscaleclercera Wunderlich, 2017

Psiloderces

Psiloderces Simon, 1892
 P. albostictus Deeleman-Reinhold, 1995 — Thailand
 P. althepoides Deeleman-Reinhold, 1995 — Malaysia (Borneo)
 P. bangkiraiensis Li & Chang, 2020 — Indonesia (Borneo)
 P. bolang Li & Chang, 2020 — Indonesia (Sulawesi)
 P. bontocensis Li & Chang, 2020 — Philippines (Luzon)
 P. cattienensis Li & Chang, 2020 — Vietnam
 P. coronatus Deeleman-Reinhold, 1995 — Indonesia (Java)
 P. cuyapoensis Li & Chang, 2020 — Philippines (Luzon)
 P. dicellocerus Li, Li & Jäger, 2014 — Indonesia (Flores)
 P. egeria Simon, 1892 (type) — Philippines (Luzon)
 P. elasticus (Brignoli, 1975) — Sri Lanka
 P. enigmatus Deeleman-Reinhold, 1995 — Malaysia (Borneo)
 P. fredstonei Deeleman-Reinhold, 1995 — Thailand
 P. gawanaensis Li & Chang, 2020 — Philippines (Luzon)
 P. grohotensis Li & Chang, 2020 — Indonesia (Borneo)
 P. heise Li & Chang, 2020 — Philippines (Luzon)
 P. howarthi Deeleman-Reinhold, 1995 — Thailand
 P. incomptus Wang & Li, 2013 — China
 P. kalimantan Deeleman-Reinhold, 1995 — Indonesia (Borneo)
 P. leclerci Deeleman-Reinhold, 1995 — Indonesia (Sulawesi)
 P. leucopygius Deeleman-Reinhold, 1995 — Indonesia (Sumatra)
 P. ligula Baert, 1988 — Indonesia (Sulawesi)
 P. limosa Deeleman-Reinhold, 1995 — Indonesia (Sumatra)
 P. longipalpis Baert, 1988 — Indonesia (Sulawesi)
 P. malinoensis Li & Chang, 2020 — Indonesia (Sulawesi)
 P. nasicornis Baert, 1988 — Indonesia (Sulawesi)
 P. palopoensis Li & Chang, 2020 — Indonesia (Sulawesi)
 P. penaeorum Deeleman-Reinhold, 1995 — Thailand
 P. penajamensis Li & Chang, 2020 — Indonesia (Borneo)
 P. pingguo Li & Chang, 2020 — Vietnam
 P. pulcher Deeleman-Reinhold, 1995 — Malaysia (Borneo)
 P. septentrionalis Deeleman-Reinhold, 1995 — Thailand
 P. suthepensis Deeleman-Reinhold, 1995 — Thailand
 P. tesselatus Deeleman-Reinhold, 1995 — Indonesia (Java)
 P. torajanus Deeleman-Reinhold, 1995 — Indonesia (Sulawesi)
 P. vallicola Deeleman-Reinhold, 1995 — Indonesia (Sumatra)
 P. wangou Li & Chang, 2020 — Indonesia (Sulawesi)
 P. xichang Li & Chang, 2020 — Philippines (Luzon)

Q

Qiongocera

Qiongocera F. Y. Li & S. Q. Li, 2017
 Q. hongjunensis F. Y. Li & S. Q. Li, 2017 (type) — China (Hainan)
 Q. luoxuan F. Y. Li & S. Q. Li, 2019 — China (Hainan)

R

Relictocera

Relictocera F. Y. Li & S. Q. Li, 2017
 R. mus (Deeleman-Reinhold, 1995) — Thailand
 R. qianzi F. Y. Li & S. Q. Li, 2019 — Thailand
 R. qiyi F. Y. Li & S. Q. Li, 2017 (type) — Vietnam
 R. sigen F. Y. Li & S. Q. Li, 2019 — Vietnam
 R. wugen F. Y. Li & S. Q. Li, 2019 — Vietnam

S

Sinoderces

Sinoderces F. Y. Li & S. Q. Li, 2017
 S. aiensis F. Y. Li & S. Q. Li, 2019 — China (Hainan)
 S. dewaroopensis F. Y. Li & S. Q. Li, 2019 — Thailand
 S. exilis (Wang & Li, 2013) — China
 S. khanensis F. Y. Li & S. Q. Li, 2019 — Laos
 S. kieoensis F. Y. Li & S. Q. Li, 2019 — Laos
 S. luohanensis F. Y. Li & S. Q. Li, 2019 — China
 S. nawanensis F. Y. Li & S. Q. Li, 2017 (type) — China
 S. phathaoensis F. Y. Li & S. Q. Li, 2019 — Laos
 S. saraburiensis F. Y. Li & S. Q. Li, 2019 — Thailand
 S. taichi F. Y. Li & S. Q. Li, 2019 — China (Hainan)
 S. wenshanensis F. Y. Li & S. Q. Li, 2019 — China
 S. xueae F. Y. Li & S. Q. Li, 2019 — China (Hainan)

T

Thaiderces

Thaiderces F. Y. Li & S. Q. Li, 2017
 T. chujiao Li & Chang, 2019 — Thailand
 T. djojosudharmoi (Deeleman-Reinhold, 1995) — Indonesia (Sumatra)
 T. fengniao Li & Chang, 2019 — Thailand
 T. ganlan Li & Chang, 2019 — Myanmar
 T. haima Li & Chang, 2019 — Thailand
 T. jian F. Y. Li & S. Q. Li, 2017 (type) — Thailand
 T. jiazi Li & Chang, 2019 — Thailand
 T. miantiao Li & Chang, 2019 — Thailand
 T. ngalauindahensis Li & Chang, 2019 — Indonesia (Sumatra)
 T. peterjaegeri Li & Chang, 2019 — Myanmar
 T. rimbu (Deeleman-Reinhold, 1995) — Indonesia (Sumatra)
 T. shuzi Li & Chang, 2019 — Thailand
 T. thamphadaengensis Li & Chang, 2019 — Thailand
 T. thamphrikensis Li & Chang, 2019 — Thailand
 T. tuoyuan Li & Chang, 2019 — Thailand
 T. vulgaris (Deeleman-Reinhold, 1995) — Thailand
 T. yangcong Li & Chang, 2019 — Indonesia (Sumatra)
 T. zuichun Li & Chang, 2019 — Thailand

References

Psilodercidae